Bruno Bortolini Jackel (born 26 December 1997), commonly known as Bruno Gaúcho, is a Brazilian footballer who plays as a defender.

Career statistics

Club

Notes

References

1997 births
Living people
Brazilian footballers
Association football defenders
Grêmio Foot-Ball Porto Alegrense players
Associação Chapecoense de Futebol players
Esporte Clube Novo Hamburgo players
Foz do Iguaçu Futebol Clube players
Esporte Clube Avenida players
Sportspeople from Rio Grande do Sul